Sami Sabit Karaman (1877; Damascus - 4 September 1957; İstanbul) was an officer of the Ottoman Army and a general of the Turkish Army.

Works
İstiklâl Mücadelesi ve Enver Paşa

Translations
Mısır'da Napolyon
Karadağ Muharebesi
Kara Subaylarına Mahsus Hukuku Harb
Süvarinin Hidemat-ı Seferiyeye İhzarı
Yahudi Tarihi ve Siyon Önderlerinin Protokolları  (The Protocols of the Elders of Zion ), Yeni Cezaevi Matbaası, 1943.

See also
List of high-ranking commanders of the Turkish War of Independence

Sources

1877 births
1957 deaths
People from Damascus
Syrian Turkmen
Karamanids
Ottoman Military Academy alumni
Syrian people of Turkish descent
Ottoman Army officers
Ottoman military personnel of the Italo-Turkish War
Ottoman military personnel of the Balkan Wars
Ottoman military personnel of World War I
Ottoman prisoners of war
World War I prisoners of war held by the United Kingdom
Turkish military personnel of the Greco-Turkish War (1919–1922)
Recipients of the Medal of Independence with Red Ribbon (Turkey)
Turkish Army generals